I'll Catch the Sun! is a jazz album by alto saxophonist Sonny Criss, recorded in 1969 and released on the Prestige label.

Reception

AllMusic awarded the album 4 stars with its review by Scott Yanow calling it "often excellent".

Track listing
 "Don't Rain on My Parade" (Bob Merrill, Jule Styne) – 4:24  
 "Blue Sunset" (Sonny Criss) – 8:10  
 "I Thought About You" (Jimmy Van Heusen, Johnny Mercer) – 4:43  
 "California Screamin (Sonny Criss) – 6:03  
 "Cry Me a River" (Arthur Hamilton) – 5:41  
 "I'll Catch the Sun" (Rod McKuen) – 5:34

Personnel
Sonny Criss – alto saxophone
Hampton Hawes – piano
Monty Budwig – bass
Shelly Manne – drums

References

Sonny Criss albums
Prestige Records albums
1969 albums
Albums produced by Don Schlitten